Route 772 is a  mostly north–south secondary looping highway on Deer Island, Charlotte County, New Brunswick, Canada.

Route description
The route's northern terminus is north of the community of Stuart Town at the L'Etete to Deer Island Ferry terminal on Deer Island. It travels southwest past Stuart Cove and through Stuart Town and Lambertville. From here, it continues to Lords Cove passing Lords Cove then passing Richardson and Hopper Pond where the highway divides and the loop begins. Travelling west, Route 772 passes Passamaquoddy Bay and enters Fairhaven. It continues past Clam Cove and Cummings Cove into the community of Cummings Cove which intersects with the Deer Island Point Road. Continuing around the loop, the highway enters Chocolate Cove and Hibernia Cove, passes Bar Island, and enters Leonardville. From here, the highway turns west again to complete the loop.

History

See also

References

External links

772
772